Richard Law (March 7, 1733 – January 26, 1806) was a delegate to the First Continental Congress, Second Continental Congress and the Congress of the Confederation. He was Mayor of New London, Connecticut and a United States district judge of the United States District Court for the District of Connecticut.

Education and career

Born on March 7, 1733, in Milford, Connecticut Colony, British America, Law pursued classical studies, graduated from Yale University in 1751 and read law in 1755. He was admitted to the bar in January 1755, and entered private practice in Milford from 1755 to 1757. He continued private practice in New London, Connecticut Colony from 1757 to 1765. He was a Justice of the Peace for New London from 1765 to 1775. He was a member of the Connecticut General Assembly from 1765 to 1776. He was Chief Judge of the New London County Court from 1773 to 1784. He was Clerk of the Connecticut General Assembly from 1774 to 1776. He was an assistant to the Connecticut General Assembly from 1776 to 1786. He was a member of the Connecticut Council of Safety in May 1776. He was a delegate, successively to the First Continental Congress, Second Continental Congress and the Congress of the Confederation in 1774, in 1776, in 1777, and from 1780 to 1783. He was a Judge of the Connecticut Superior Court in New London from 1784 to 1789, serving as Chief Judge from 1786 to 1789. He was the Mayor of New London, Connecticut from 1784 to 1806.

Notable case

In October 1786, Richard Law presided over the trial of twelve year old Hannah Ocuish, a half-Pequot Indian girl, for the murder of six year old Eunice Bolles. Upon the conclusion of the trial, Law sentenced the young girl to death on October 16, 1786. Ocuish was hanged for her crime on December 20, 1786, three months shy of her thirteenth birthday.

Federal judicial service

He was confirmed by the United States Senate on September 26, 1789, and received his commission the same day. His service terminated on January 26, 1806, due to his death in New London. He was interred in Cedar Grove Cemetery in New London.

Family

Law was the father of Lyman Law, a United States representative from Connecticut, and grandfather of John Law, a United States Representative from Indiana.

References

Sources
 (erroneously listed as having been a judge on the Connecticut Supreme Court instead of the Connecticut Superior Court)
 
 Streib, Victor L., Death Penalty for Juveniles. Indiana University Press. 1987. Pgs 74-75.

1733 births
1806 deaths
Continental Congressmen from Connecticut
18th-century American politicians
Judges of the United States District Court for the District of Connecticut
United States federal judges appointed by George Washington
18th-century American judges
Chief Justices of the Connecticut Supreme Court
Members of the Connecticut General Assembly Council of Assistants (1662–1818)
United States federal judges admitted to the practice of law by reading law
Burials at Cedar Grove Cemetery (New London, Connecticut)
Yale College alumni
Mayors of New London, Connecticut